Cromna may refer to:
 Cromna (Arcadia), a town of ancient Arcadia, Greece
 Cromna (Corinthia), a town of ancient Corinthia, Greece
 Cromna (Paphlagonia), a town of ancient Paphlagonia, now in Turkey
 Amasra, a possible site of the Paphlagonian town
 Kurucaşile, a possible site of the Paphlagonian town
 Cromna, a genus of fulgoroid planthoppers in the family Flatidae